Sain Kamal Khan Sherani (Pashto:سايي کمال خان شیراني)(3 January 1924—5 November 2010)
was the founding member and leader of Pakhtunkhwa Milli Awami Party a democratic Pashtun nationalist political party in Pakistan.

Sain Kamal Khan Sherani was born in district Zhob British India village shina ponga (شنه پونګه) in middle class Sherani tribe family. His father name was Esa Khan and he has business in Delhi. Sain has three brothers named Mutha Khan, Ibrahim Khan, Nawab Khan and has two sisters. He has six children in number five sons and only daughter.

Education
Kamal Khan Sherani got his basic education from a nearby primary school karama malik Balo khan karmanzai Zhob and in 1939 he got admission in  "Sandeman High School Quetta" by scholarship. After completing his Matriculation, in 1940 he proceeded to Islamia College University Peshawar, obtaining an Honours degree in Economics.

Political career
Sain Kamal Khan Sherani was the closest companion of Khan Shaheed Abdul Samad Khan Achakzai.

Criticism
Although, Sain Kamal Khan Sherani is revered as an intellectual by his followers many see him as a land grabber. He has encroached upon acres of land belonging to the local Babar tribe in Zhob District using his political influence. The case was contested in Balochistan High Court which he lost and a vacation order was passed but still his family hasn't vacated the encroached land.

Death
In the first week of November, he was taken violently ill and for the last five days he hovered between life and death, every moment henceforth was a risk; when ultimately on 5 November 2010, the paragon of intellectual gentry and the greatest living fighter against obscurantism ceased to fight and gave in, and peacefully gone to sleep.

References

1924 births
2010 deaths
People from Zhob District
Pashtunkhwa Milli Awami Party politicians
Islamia College University alumni